Jason Hall (born October 31, 1983) is a former American football defensive end for the Buffalo Bills, Carolina Panthers, and Tennessee Titans in the National Football League. Hall attended high school at The McCallie School in Chattanooga, where he won the state title as a senior. He also won TSSAA's Division II-AAA Player of the Year honors and was Runner-Up for the 2002 American General Mr. Football Award.

In the summer Jason joined the 2002 Tennessee Volunteers football team. During his 4 years spent there he was a major contributor at defensive end and special teams on national ranked squads. As a senior Jason enjoyed his best year at UT establishing himself as a premiere pass rusher on a defensive unit that boasted the #1 Ranked Defensive Line in the Country as voted by Athlon Sports (2005). Hall posted a career high in sacks, 7, and tied a University of Tennessee record by recording a sack in five consecutive games. He was voted to the All-Southeastern Conference (AP) Defensive 2nd Team. Following his successful collegiate campaign he still went undrafted in the 2006 NFL Draft.

Immediately following the draft, Hall was called up and signed by the Buffalo Bills. With the Bills, Jason, was mostly a special teams contributor and played sparingly at Defensive End. After being released from the Bills, Hall signed with the Carolina Panthers with the intentions of first going to Germany to play in NFL Europe (NFLE). Jason was then drafted and signed by the Cologne Centurions of NFL Europa. He played impressively well setting a career and franchise record in sacks with 13.  Hall was named to the All NFL Europe First-team and the Defensive MVP of the league. Hall then came back to the states in time for training camp and the upcoming NFL season with the Carolina Panthers. Hall worked hard to crack the lineup playing behind multiple All Pro defensive lineman. He suffered an injury that ended his season prematurely with team. He was subsequently released by the Panthers and put on waivers. Hall was then claimed off waivers by the Tennessee Titans after less than a 24 hr wait.

Jason made an immediate impact as a pass-rushing specialist. Hall was a perfect fit for Jim Washburn's Wide 9 alignment used for speed-rushing defensive ends. He played well in a reserve role and posted career high numbers in quarterback pressures and sacks. However, once again Hall's season was injury-plagued and end of the season surgery was required. Jason attempted to return to the team to participate in offseason drills, but could not regain his previous form. On March 1, 2009 Jason was released by the Titans and he retired from playing shortly thereafter. Despite having his professional playing career cut short, Jason has enjoyed great success in his post playing days. He is the creator and Master Programmer of Kettle Corps, a community of passionate individuals that subscribe to a Kettlebell and Bodyweight Calisthenic alternative fitness program focused on the unique development of the 3 Fundamental Fitness Skills (Stability, Mobility, and Strength).

College career
Hall played college football with the Tennessee Volunteers. He started all 11 games as a senior at Tennessee setting career highs with 51 tackles and seven sacks (second on the team), and was named to the 2005 All-SEC Second-team. By the end of his college career he had played in 44 games with 12 starts at Tennessee and compiled 101 tackles, 11 sacks, one forced fumble, one fumble recovery and four passes defensed.

Pro day results
Dates:
03/15/06
03/29/06
40-yard dash: 4.7	
225 Lb. Bench Reps: 30
Vertical jump: 36
Broad jump: 9'7"
20-yard shuttle: 4.56
3 cone drill: 7.63

NFL Europa career
After being signed by the Carolina Panthers, Hall was sent to NFL Europa's Cologne Centurions. He made an immediate impact, being named Defensive MVP in 2007, as well as setting a franchise record with 13 sacks. Hall was only the second Centurion to win the Defensive MVP award, the other being fellow Panther Deke Cooper. He also tied a league mark by posting a sack in seven consecutive contests, and was named to the All-NFL Europa Team. Hall's contributions helped the Centurions to being the number one defense in the league, and the team allowed an average of only 256.1 yards per game. Hall started all 10 games of his NFL Europa season and career.

Stats

NFL career

Buffalo Bills 
On April 30, 2006 Hall was signed by the Buffalo Bills to provide quality pass rush depth to their defensive unit at the defensive end position.  The 6-foot-3-inch, 260-pounder also played a key role on the NFL's number one special teams units. Unfortunately, a change in coaching staff and subsoquent philosophy led to Hall's early departure from the team.

Carolina Panthers 
Hall was signed by the Carolina Panthers in January 2007 as a restricted free agent. He was then allocated to the Cologne Centurions of NFL Europa where he became the franchise's all-time sack leader and the League Defensive MVP with 13 sacks. Upon his return to the Panthers Hall worked his way into a strong defensive line rotation featuring multiple Pro Bowlers. However, after being injured late in the season, Hall, was eventually waived by the Panthers on December 18, 2007.

Tennessee Titans 
On August 15, 2008 the Tennessee Titans claimed Hall from waivers after less than a 24-hour wait. He quickly worked his way into the lineup and made an immediate impact with his knack for rushing the passer. Hall's production helped to propel the team to a remarkable 13-3 regular season. He finished the year with career highs in quarterback pressures, 14, and sacks, 6. The following season Hall was unable to return to his previous form after multiple offseason orthopedic procedures on his knees. Hall was released on March 1, 2009.

References 

1983 births
Living people
American football defensive ends
Tennessee Volunteers football players
Cologne Centurions (NFL Europe) players
Players of American football from Tennessee
Players of American football from Marietta, Georgia
Buffalo Bills players
Carolina Panthers players
Tennessee Titans players